The 2008 UCI Track Cycling World Championships were the World Championship for track cycling. They took place at the Manchester Velodrome in Manchester, United Kingdom from 26 to 30 March 2008. Eighteen events were scheduled; the women's team pursuit being the only addition from the 2007 championships.

As in 2007, the domination of the Great Britain team was clear. Breaking three world records en route, they won eleven medals in total. Indeed, half of the eighteen gold medals on offer were won by the British team.

Medal table

Medal summary

External links

Results book
 2008 UCI Track Cycling World Championships - CM Great Britain, March 26-30, 2008 Cycling News

See also

 2008–09 UCI Track Cycling World Ranking
 2008 in track cycling

 
Uci Track Cycling World Championships, 2008
Track cycling
UCI Track Cycling World Championships by year
2008 in English sport
Track cycling
International cycle races hosted by England
International sports competitions in Manchester
March 2008 sports events in Europe